YouTube Rewind 2019: For the Record (also known as YouTube Rewind 2019) is a video that was uploaded to YouTube's official channel on the video-sharing website YouTube on December 5, 2019, as the tenth and final installment of the YouTube Rewind series. The video contains montages of the top videos and YouTubers of the year.

Although marked as an improvement over the previous installment, YouTube Rewind 2018: Everyone Controls Rewind, the video received negative reviews, with critics and the general audience finding the video uncreative in comparison to past Rewind videos.

For the Record amassed over 3.1 million dislikes within 24 hours of release and 5 million dislikes within 48 hours of release, more than those acquired by YouTube Rewind 2018 in the same timeframes. It currently has over 9.6 million dislikes, making it the seventh most disliked video on YouTube.

Overview
The video begins with a 'rewind' of 2019's most viewed/liked videos on YouTube. It then cuts to a scene from YouTube Rewind 2018: Everyone Controls Rewind where Casey Neistat and the Merrell Twins suggest K-pop as one of the themes for the rewind. Following this, it cuts to multiple YouTubers' reactions to this scene where it has been labelled as awkward and YouTube themselves stating that "In 2018, we made something you didn't like. So in 2019, let's see what you DID like. Because you're better at this than we are", with the words on screen. A compilation of trending YouTube videos from 2019 is shown, then cuts to the words on screen, saying "You made these the MOST LIKED CREATOR VIDEOS of 2019, duh...", in the form of a 'Top 10' list, with a short snippet of each video playing at their appropriate times.

The video then proceeds to show the "Most Liked Music Videos", again in the form of a 'Top 10' list with a short snippet of each video playing at their appropriate times.

The video then proceeds to show the "Most Liked Dance Videos" in the form of a 'Top 5' list with a short snippet of each video playing at their appropriate times.

The video proceeds to show the "Most Viewed Video Games" in the form of a 'Top 5' list with a short snippet of game-play at their appropriate times.

The video proceeds to show the "Most Liked Beauty Videos" in the form of a 'Top 5' list with a short snippet of each video at their appropriate times.

The video cuts to another tape 'rewind' with the words on-screen: "You helped these New Creators Break Out", then proceeds to show YouTube channels with the most subscribers which first uploaded in 2019 in the form of a 'Top 10' list with a short snippet of videos from each creator at their appropriate times.

The video cuts to another tape rewind, with the words on-screen: "You made these the Most Watched Creators", then proceeds to show the most viewed creators of 2019 in the form of a 'Top 10' list with short snippets of videos from each creator at their appropriate times.

The video cuts to the words on screen: "You liked, disliked, watched, subscribed, commented, shared, uploaded, played, listened, saved, created. Thank you for a record breaking 2019." It then proceeds to show multiple channels and their achievements in 2019 with appropriate videos.

It then cuts to a short time-lapsed compilation of 2019's trending videos being 'sucked' into the middle. The video ends with a shot from Lil Dicky's music video of his song "Earth".

Production 
The 2019 edition returned to a format more reminiscent of the early iterations of the series, featuring a montage of the top videos of 2019, divided into several themed countdowns based on statistics and trends. Kevin Allocca, YouTube's head of culture and trends, explained that the video was intended to be more reflective of the year's trends, acknowledging that it was becoming more difficult for the previous format to "authentically represent" the community's overall experience.

Cast 
Below is a list of channels featured in the top lists in YouTube Rewind 2019, derived from the video's description:

1MILLION Dance Studio
A4
Anaysa 
Andymation
Ariana Grande
Awez Darbar
Aya Nakamura
Azzyland
Badabun
Billie Eilish
Black Gryph0n
Blackpink
BTS
ChapkisDanceUSA
Daddy Yankee
David Dobrik
Dude Perfect
F2Freestylers
Felipe Neto
Fischer's- フィッシャーズ
Galen Hooks
HYBE LABELS
James Charles
Jeffree Star
Jelly
Kaykai Salaider
Kurzgesagt – In a Nutshell
Kylie Jenner
Lazarbeam
Lil Dicky
Lil Nas X
LOUD
LOUD Babi
LOUD Coringa
Magnet World
MrBeast
Nilson Izaias Papinho Oficial
Noah Schnapp
Noor Stars
백종원의 요리비책 Paik's Cuisine
Pencilmation
PewDiePie
Rosalia
Seth Everman
Shane Dawson
Shawn Mendes
Team Naach
T-Series
whinderssonnunes
워크맨-Workman
하루한끼 one meal a day

Below is a list of channels whose footage was included in YouTube Rewind 2019, but were not featured in the top lists of YouTube Rewind 2019:

Angie Velasco
Atta Halilintar
Badabun
Big Marvel
Blanco Brown
Brooklyn and Bailey
Casey Neistat
Connor Franta
Emma Chamberlain
Free Fire - Brasil
GamingWithKev
Garena Free Fire Indonesia
h3h3Productions
Hongyu ASMR 홍유
HunniBee ASMR
IAMLXGEND
ItsFunneh
Jenna Marbles
Jennelle Eliana
Lachlan
mrfreshasian
NikkieTutorials
PlayHard
RiceGum
ROSALÍA
Shoaib Akhtar
Sidemen
Simone Giertz
SQUEEZIE
Suzy Lu
Tati
The Try Guys
TheDonato
Pac-12 Networks
VEGETTA777

Soundtrack 
YouTube Rewind 2019 contains the following songs (timestamps in brackets refer to when the song appears in the Rewind video):
"7 Rings" by Ariana Grande (0:22–1:34)
"Tokyo Drifting" by Glass Animals and Denzel Curry (1:35–2:27)
"Bad Guy" by Billie Eilish (2:29–3:15)
"Don't Start Now" by Dua Lipa (3:17–5:23)

Reception 
Despite being seen as an improvement over the previous year's Everyone Controls Rewind, For the Record received negative reviews, with many viewers disappointed that it did not have the same level of production as previous installments in the series, and noting it as being akin to WatchMojo videos. Many also felt the new format lacked "ambition, energy and a soul", and that it showed that YouTube was being openly more corporate and uncaring towards their creators. Others have also noted the omission of PewDiePie's "Congratulations" from the list of most liked music videos of the year, despite YouTube's listing standards which prevent geo-restricted content from being included in For the Record. Another PewDiePie-related criticism was how none of his accomplishments were included in the "YouTubers' Achievements in 2019" segment, yet it included T-Series (the first channel to hit 100 million subscribers, despite PewDiePie becoming the first creator to do so) and Enes Batur (a creator from Turkey who came under fire for copying PewDiePie, and abusing the copyright system against fellow creator JT after he called Batur out on said copying.) Similarly to last year, some viewers criticized the video for its complete lack of tributes to YouTubers that had died before December, such as Desmond "Etika" Amofah. However, viewers saw improvement with casting choices in some areas, particularly with the inclusion of PewDiePie, who was absent in the last two installments. For the Record won the 2020 Webby Award for Entertainment in the category Web.

Despite being included in the video, PewDiePie, along with FlyingKitty, Party In Backyard, Grandayy and Dolan Dark, created their take of it on December 29, 2019, titled "YouTube Rewind 2019, but it's actually good", which focused on the notable memes of 2019 and also paid homage to various recently deceased creators, including Dillon the Hacker, Etika and Grant Thompson.

, For the Record currently has over 117 million views and over 9.5 million dislikes, making it the sixth most-disliked YouTube video and the third most-disliked non-music YouTube video of all time after Everyone Controls Rewind and the trailer for Sadak 2. It was peaked as the third most-disliked video at the time before being surpassed by the Sadak 2 trailer within three days.

See also 
List of most-disliked YouTube videos

References

External links 
 
 The creators, music and moments as featured in REWIND 2019 (playlist)

2019 YouTube videos
2019 controversies
2019 in Internet culture
2019 works
Internet memes
Viral videos
Works about video games
YouTube controversies